1974–75 Austrian Football Bundesliga is the 1st season of the Bundesliga.It was contested by 10 teams, and Wacker Innsbruck won the championship.

Teams and locations 

Teams of 1974–75 Austrian Football Bundesliga
FC Admira/Wacker
Austria Salzburg
Austria Wien
Kärnten
LASK
Rapid Wien
SC Eisenstadt
Sturm Graz
VÖEST Linz
Wacker Innsbruck

League standings

Results
Teams played each other four times in the league. In the first half of the season each team played every other team twice (home and away), and then did the same in the second half of the season.

First half of season

Second half of season

Bundesliga teams in Europe

References
Austria - List of final tables (RSSSF)

Austrian Football Bundesliga seasons
Aust
1974–75 in Austrian football